Yelizaveta Yakovlevna Tarakhovskaya (1891–1968) was a Russian poet, playwright, translator, and author of children's books. She is most known for her play By the Pike's Wish (1936).

Biography
Yelizaveta Tarakhovskaya (born Parnokh) was born in the city of Taganrog on July 26, 1891, in a pharmacist's family. She is sister to poet Sophia Parnok and twin sister to founder of Soviet Russian jazz Valentin Parnakh. She graduated from the Taganrog Girls Gymnasium, later studied in Bestuzhev courses in Saint Petersburg and started to write poems in her childhood.

In 1925, her first books were published: On How Chocolate Came to MosSelProm and Tit Will Fly. Since then, she wrote many children's books, including Metropolitan (1932), The Moon and the Lazy Fellow (1933), The Seagull (1965, dedicated to Valentina Tereshkova, Soviet Russian cosmonaut, the first woman to go into space). She is the author of poems for grown-ups: The Violin Clef (1958), The Bird (1965). The verses of Tarakhovskaya are lyrical, thoughtful, and almost always full of humor, with most of them being the poetry of ordinary and everyday things around.

Yelizaveta Tarakhovskaya translated into Russian many poems for children written by various Soviet and foreign authors: verses of Polish poet Julian Tuwim, Uzbek poet Kuddus Muhammadi (Muhammadiev), Azerbaijani poet Mirvari Dilbazi, Georgian poet Mariki Baratashvili(მარიკა ბარათაშვილი), Lithuanian poet Eduardas Mieželaitis, Bulgarian poet Assen Bossev and many more.

Today Tarakhovskaya is probably most known for her play By the Pike's Wish, which was staged by Sergey Obraztsov in the Moscow State Academic Puppet Show named after Serguei Obraztsov in November 1936 and has remained in the theater's repertoire ever since. The play By the Pike's Wish (Po shchuchuyemu veleniyu) is considered by theater experts as the greatest puppet show of the 20th century, making quintessence of Meyerhold's methods. It was also released as a motion picture in 1938 (directed by Aleksandr Rou).

Yelizaveta Tarakhovskaya died in Moscow on November 11, 1968, and was buried on Novodevichy Cemetery near her twin-brother Valentin.

A memorial plaque dedicated to Parnok family was placed on the wall of their birth house in Taganrog in 2012.

Works (alphabetical list)

12 без пяти /  М.: Гиз, 1930.
Бей в барабан! / М.: Мол. гвардия, 1932.
Бей в барабан! / М.: Гиз, 1930.
Бей в барабан! / Изд. 3-е. М.: Мол. гвардия, 1930.
Воздушный парад / М.; Л.: Детиздат, 1937.
Где овечка без хвоста? / М.; Л.: Гиз, 1930.
Дружба /Ташкент: Госиздат Уз. ССР, 1942.
Железная дорога / М.: Г. Ф. Мириманов, 1928.
Калитка в сад / М.; Л.: Детгиз, 1949.
Колокол в море / М.: Гиз, 1930.
Костя, клоп и микроскоп / Л.: Радуга, 1929.
Метро / М.: Детгиз, 1951.
Метро. Изд. 3-е. М.; Л.: Детиздат, 1938.
Метрополитен / М.: Детгиз, 1935.
Метрополитен / Изд. 2-е. М.: Детиздат, 1936.
Метрополитен / М.: Мол. гвардия, 1932.
Новый дом / Изд. 2-е. М.; Л.: Мол. гвардия, 1931.
Новый дом / 1928.
Новый дом / М.; Л.: Гиз, 1930.
О том, как приехал шоколад в Моссельпром /Рязань: Изд. "Друзья детей", 1925.
Огород / 1928.
Радиобригада / М.: Гиз, 1930.
Радиобригада / Изд. 2-е. М.; Л.: Мол. гвардия, 1931.
Сказка про живую воду / М.; Л.: Детгиз, 1953.
Солнечные часы / М.; Л.: Детгиз, 1947.
Солнечные часы / Ставрополь: Ставроп. правда, 1947.
Стальные ребята / М.: Гиз, 1929.
Стихи / М.; Л.: Детгиз, 1951.
Стихи и сказки / М.: Детгиз, 1954.
Тит полетит / М.: ЗИФ, 1925.
У Черного моря / М.: Гиз, 1928.
Универмаг / М.: Гиз, 1930.

References

Sources
 Таганрог. Энциклопедия. — Таганрог: Антон, 2008

External links
 

1891 births
1968 deaths
Writers from Taganrog
People from Don Host Oblast
Russian Jews
Jewish poets
Russian children's writers
Russian dramatists and playwrights
Russian writers
Soviet poets
Soviet children's writers
Soviet women writers
Soviet dramatists and playwrights
Russian twins
Russian women children's writers
Russian women poets
Women dramatists and playwrights
20th-century Russian women writers
Burials at Novodevichy Cemetery
Soviet women poets